Carl P. Pulfrich (September 24, 1858 in Burscheid, Rhine Province – August 12, 1927 in Baltic Sea, drowned when his canoe capsized) was a German physicist, noted for advancements in optics made as a researcher for the Carl Zeiss company in Jena around 1880, and for documenting the Pulfrich effect, a psycho-optical phenomenon that can be used to create a type of 3-D visual effect. Carl Pulfrich was the brother-in-law of Heinrich Hertz.

Advances in optics 
Pulfrich was employed to develop stereoscopy from being pure entertainment to a powerful quantitative technique. His apparatus to measure distances stereoscopically was first presented in Munich in 1899. This was further developed to a stereo-comparator which was presented in Hamburg in 1901. Stereoscopy was used for topographic mapping, astronomy and oceanography because everything could be done quickly and precisely. He pioneered the use of aerial photography surveys.

He introduced in 1909 a "Vacation Course in Stereophotogrammetry", that gave rise to the annual "Photogrammetry Week" running for more than a century.
Leica Geosystems sponsors the "Carl Pulfrich Award", to honour advancements in the fields of photogrammetry, remote sensing, and earth imaging.

Pulfrich had realised that people in whom visual function differed between both eyes perceived the stereo-effect:

Pulfrich's comment implies a list of diseases in which the stereo-effect can occur. He wondered why the stereo-effect was not noted earlier because of the abundance of swinging clock pendulums:

Pulfrich refractometer 
A Pulfrich refractometer measures refractive index of a sample by measuring the critical angle of the sample with a well characterized prism. Pulfrich and Max Wolz invented it at the Zeiss factory.

See also
 Blink comparator
 Hinman collator

References

External links
 

1858 births
1927 deaths
People from Burscheid
19th-century German physicists
Photogrammetrists
People from the Rhine Province
Carl Zeiss AG people
20th-century German physicists